Emmanuel Carasso or Emanuel Karasu  (1862 in Salonica – 1934 in Trieste) was an Ottoman lawyer and a member of the prominent Sephardic Jewish Carasso family of Ottoman Salonica (now Thessaloniki, Greece). He was also a prominent member of the Young Turks. The name is also spelled Karaso, Karassu, Karso, Karsu and Karasso. The form Karasu is a Turkification of his name, meaning literally 'dark water'. Emmanuel's uncle was the physician Isaac Carasso, also Salonica-born Sephardic Jew from the Ottoman Empire, who began producing Danone yogurt in Barcelona, Spain in 1919.

Karasu was a member (some sources say founder) and later president of the Macedonian Risorta Masonic lodge in Thessaloniki and pioneered the masonic movement within the Ottoman Empire. Masonic lodges and other secret societies in Salonica were meeting places for sympathizers of the Young Turks, including Talat Pasha.  Karasu was one of the first non-Muslim members of the Ottoman Freedom Society, which later became part of the Committee of Union and Progress (CUP); when the CUP came to power, he became the Salonica deputy in the Ottoman parliament. He was offered various positions in the Ottoman government, but turned them down. Karasu was one of the four men who told Sultan Abdülhamid II of his deposition in April 1909. He worked for the cooperation of various Jewish organizations in Turkey, and insisted that Turkish Jews were Turks first and Jews second. He was a member of the committee which negotiated the treaty ending the Italo-Turkish War and of the committee to internationalize the city of Salonika.  He lost favor under Atatürk and went into exile in Italy.

Death

He died in 1934, and is buried in the Jewish cemetery in Arnavutköy, Istanbul.

References

Sephardi Jews from the Ottoman Empire
Jews from Thessaloniki
Politicians of the Ottoman Empire
Jewish Ottoman politicians
1862 births
1934 deaths
Committee of Union and Progress politicians
Young Turks
Istanbul University Faculty of Law alumni
Freemasonry-related controversies